Paracles emerita is a moth of the subfamily Arctiinae first described by Schaus in 1833. It is found in Paraguay.

References

Moths described in 1933
Paracles